Fremont High School may refer to:

United States

 John C. Fremont High School, Los Angeles, California
 Fremont High School (Oakland, California), formerly known as Fremont Federation of High Schools
 Fremont High School (Sunnyvale, California)
 North Fremont High School, Ashton, Idaho
 South Fremont High School, St. Anthony, Idaho
 Fremont High School (Indiana)
 Fremont High School (Fremont, Michigan)
 Fremont Senior High School (Nebraska)
 Fremont Ross High School, Fremont, Ohio
 Fremont High School (Utah), in Plain City

Other places
 Fremont High School, now Fremont-Elizabeth City High School, in South Australia

See also
 Fremont Union High School District, Northern California, United States